King's Highway 108, commonly referred to as Highway 108, is a provincially maintained highway in the Canadian province of Ontario. The highway continues as Secondary Highway 639 north of Quirke Mine Road.

A second unrelated Highway 108 existed for approximately a year in Toronto, following The Queensway between Highway 27 and the Queen Elizabeth Way. Like most provincial highways in Toronto, it was transferred to Metropolitan Toronto after its formation. The current Highway 108 was designated in 1957 and has remained more-or-less unchanged since then.

Route description 
Highway 108 is a highway in Algoma District that serves to connect the Trans-Canada Highway with the mines in the Elliot Lake and Quirke Lake area. Elliot Lake is the only community on the highway and is located approximately two-thirds of the distance between Highway 17 and Highway 546.

Within the urban portion of Elliot Lake, the highway is locally maintained under a Connecting Link agreement. It passes the Nuclear Mining Museum and the Mount Dufour ski resort before leaving the community and crossing the eastern end of the geographic Elliot Lake. From this point to the northern terminus of the highway, the route provides access to several mines that dot the surrounding areas. Immediately south of Quirke Mine Road, Highway 108 becomes Secondary Highway 639; the centre lane ends and the pavement quality is visibly reduced.

Highway 108 forms part of the Deer Trail tourist route, which continues north along Highway 639, then southwest along Highway 546 to Iron Bridge. Like other provincial routes in Ontario, Highway 108 is maintained by the Ministry of Transportation of Ontario. In 2010, traffic surveys conducted by the ministry showed that on average, 2,250 vehicles used the highway daily along the  section immediately south of the Elliot Lake Connecting Link while 280 vehicles did so each day along the northernmost section approaching Highway 639, the highest and lowest counts along the highway, respectively.

History 
Highway 108 in Algoma is the second highway to carry the designation. In 1953, The Queensway in Toronto was assumed by the Department of Highways (DHO) as the original Highway 108, between Highway 27 (now Highway 427) and the eastern end of the Queen Elizabeth Way at the Humber River.
The route was created in order to widen it to provide access from Highway 27 to the new DHO offices at Kipling as well as the Ontario Food Terminal.
The designation was short lived, and the route was decommissioned and transferred to the newly formed Metropolitan Toronto on December 26, 1956.

The current iteration of Highway 108 was assumed by the Department of Highways in sections, beginning in late 1957, shortly after the discovery of uranium deposits in the area. Prior to its assumption, the route it followed was designated as Highway 612. The first section, located in the urbanized area of Elliot Lake, was assumed on December 19, 1957. This was followed on December 30 with the majority of the route being assumed. Finally, on January 23, 1958, the northernmost  of Highway 612 was designated as part of Highway 108, eliminating that highway entirely.
On January 1, 1998, a  section of the highway was transferred to the Municipality of Elliot Lake.
The route has remained unchanged since then.

Major intersections

References

108
Transport in Elliot Lake
Roads in Algoma District